Mount Queets is a  mountain summit located deep within Olympic National Park in Jefferson County of Washington state. With a good eye and clear weather, the top of the mountain can be seen from the visitor center at Hurricane Ridge. Its nearest higher peak is Mount Meany (6,695 ft),  to the south. Due to heavy winter snowfalls, Mount Queets supports the Queets Glacier in a cirque on its north slope, despite its modest elevation. Precipitation runoff from the mountain drains into the headwaters of both the Elwha River and Queets River. There are scrambling routes ranging from class YDS 2 via the North Ridge, class 3 via the ridge from Mt. Meany, and class 4 via the Queets Glacier.

History

The present day Mt. Meany - Mt. Queets area was referred to as Mt. Mesachie on the 1896 Gilman National Geographic Map. The word mesachie is from Chinook Jargon and means wicked.

The mountain was dubbed "Mt. Hearst" during the 1889-90 Seattle Press Expedition to honor William Randolph Hearst, owner of the San Francisco Examiner, but Mount Queets is the officially accepted name today. The name "Queets" first appeared on the Surveyor General's map of Washington Territory referring to the Queets River, then was later applied to the glacier on the mountain which is the primary source of the river. The word "Queets" is a derivation of the name of the Quai'tso (Queets) tribe.

The first ascent of the mountain was made in 1890 by Harry Fisher (aka James B. Hanmore) and Nelson Linsley during the second O’Neil Expedition.

Climate

Based on the Köppen climate classification, Mount Queets is located in the marine west coast climate zone of western North America. Most weather fronts originate in the Pacific Ocean, and travel northeast toward the Olympic Mountains. As fronts approach, they are forced upward by the peaks of the Olympic Range, causing them to drop their moisture in the form of rain or snowfall (Orographic lift). As a result, the Olympics experience high precipitation, especially during the winter months. During winter months, weather is usually cloudy, but, due to high pressure systems over the Pacific Ocean that intensify during summer months, there is often little or no cloud cover during the summer. In terms of favorable weather, the best months for climbing are June through September.

See also

 Olympic Mountains
 Queets River
 Geology of the Pacific Northwest

References

External links

 
 Mount Queets weather: Mountain Forecast
 Aerial photo: PBase

Olympic Mountains
Mountains of Washington (state)
Landforms of Olympic National Park
North American 1000 m summits